Beatrix Lamprecht is a Namibian international lawn bowler.

Bowls career
She won a silver medal in triples at the 2009 Atlantic Bowls Championships in Johannesburg.

She was selected to represent Namibia at the 2010 Commonwealth Games, where she competed in the triples event.

References

Living people
Namibian bowls players
Year of birth missing (living people)